Back to God's Country may refer to:

 "Back to God's Country" (originally "Wapi the Walrus"), a short story by James Oliver Curwood, adapted for the following three films:
 Back to God's Country (1919 film), a Canadian silent film starring Nell Shipman
 Back to God's Country (1927 film), an American silent film starring Renée Adorée
 Back to God's Country (1953 film), an American film starring Rock Hudson

See also
 God's Country (disambiguation)